Micha Djorkaeff (born 24 March 1974) is a French former professional footballer who played as a midfielder.

Career
Micha Djorkaeff played in French lower series for Grenoble, Rouen and Olympique Ales. In 1997, his older brother Youri recommended him to the Serie A club that he was playing for at the time, Inter Milan, that aggregated him at the team for a friendly summer tournament in Hong Kong. Despite scoring one goal he did not play very well and was sold to Fiorenzuola in Serie C1. There he never managed to play a game and after a year he was sold to Étoile Carouge FC. He then continued his career with Étoile FC, 1. FC Kaiserslautern II, Luton Town and Decines.

Personal life
Micha Djorkaeff is the son of former French footballer Jean Djorkaeff, and the younger brother of former French international footballer Youri Djorkaeff, and the uncle of Oan Djorkaeff.

References

External links

Micha Djorkaeff Profile at tuttomercatoweb.com 

Living people
1974 births
French people of Armenian descent
French people of Kalmyk descent
French people of Polish descent
French footballers
Association football midfielders
Ligue 2 players
Grenoble Foot 38 players
FC Rouen players
Olympique Alès players
U.S. Fiorenzuola 1922 S.S. players
Étoile Carouge FC players
ÉFC Fréjus Saint-Raphaël players
1. FC Kaiserslautern II players
Luton Town F.C. players
French expatriate footballers
French expatriate sportspeople in Italy
Expatriate footballers in Italy
French expatriate sportspeople in Germany
Expatriate footballers in Germany
French expatriate sportspeople in England
Expatriate footballers in England
Djorkaeff family
People from Rueil-Malmaison